Morten Haugstvedt  is a Norwegian handball player.

He made his debut on the Norwegian national team in 1992, 
and played 25 matches for the national team between 1992 and 1994. He participated at the 1993 World Men's Handball Championship.

References

Year of birth missing (living people)
Living people
Norwegian male handball players